The Lepontii were an ancient Celtic people occupying portions of Rhaetia (in modern Switzerland and Northern Italy) in the Alps during the late Bronze Age/Iron Age. Recent archeological excavations and their association with the Golasecca culture (9th-7th centuries BC) and Canegrate culture (13th century BC) point to a Celtic affiliation. From the analysis of their language and the place names of the old Lepontic areas, it was hypothesized that these people represent a layer similar to that Celtic but previous to the Gallic penetration in the Po valley. The suggestion has been made that the Lepontii may have been celticized Ligurians.

The chief towns of the Lepontii were Oscela, now Domodossola, Italy, and Bilitio, now Bellinzona, Switzerland. Their territory included the southern slopes of the St. Gotthard Pass and Simplon Pass, corresponding roughly to present-day Ossola and Ticino.

A map of Rhaetia shows the location of the Lepontic territory, in the south-western corner of Rhaetia. The area to the south, including what was to become the Insubrian capital Mediolanum (modern Milan), was Etruscan around 600-500 BC, when the Lepontii began writing tombstone inscriptions in their alphabet, one of several Etruscan-derived alphabets in the Rhaetian territory.

See also
 Lepontic language 
 Canegrate culture
 Celts in the Alps and Po Valley
 Cisalpine Gaulish
 Golasecca culture
 Ancient peoples of Italy

Notes

Sources
Piana Agostinetti P. 1972, Documenti per la protostoria della Val d’Ossola. San Bernardo d’Ornavasso e le altre necropoli preromane, Milano.
Tibiletti Bruno, M. G. (1978). "Ligure, leponzio e gallico". In Popoli e civiltà dell'Italia antica vi, Lingue e dialetti, ed. A. L. Prosdocimi, 129–208. Rome: Biblioteca di Storia Patria.
Tibiletti Bruno, M. G. (1981). "Le iscrizioni celtiche d'Italia". In I Celti d'Italia, ed. E. Campanile, 157–207. Pisa: Giardini.
ULRICH-BANSA O.1957, Monete rinvenute nelle necropoli di Ornavasso, in “Rivista Italiana di Numismatica”, LIX, pp. 6–69.
 
 
{{cite book | author=AA.VV. and De Marinis, R.C. | title=I Celti, capìtol I Celti Golasecchiani| publisher=Bompiani| year=1991 }}
Stifter, D. 2020. Cisalpine Celtic. Language, Writing, Epigraphy''. Aelaw Booklet 8. Zaragoza: Prensas de la Universidad de Zaragoza.
Stifter, D. 2020. «Cisalpine Celtic», Palaeohispanica 20: 335–365.

Ancient peoples of Italy
Historical Celtic peoples
Golasecca culture